Izimarino (İzimari) is a rural locality (a village) in Tynbayevsky Selsoviet, Mishkinsky District, Bashkortostan, Russia. The population was 312 as of 2010. There are 3 streets.

Geography 
Izimarino is located 52 km west of Mishkino (the district's administrative centre) by road. Toktarovo is the nearest rural locality.

References 

Rural localities in Mishkinsky District